Nikolai Ivanovich Myshagin (15 October 1955 – 23 November 2020) was a Kazakhstani-Russian professional ice hockey coach.

Career
He coached the Kazakhstan men's national ice hockey team at the 2006 Winter Olympics. Myshagin was the graduate of Ust-Kamenogorsk ice hockey school. He played only one season for Sputnik Almetyevsk in 1976. He is mostly known as an ice hockey coach. He was the honored coach of Kazakh SSR.

Coaching career
1996–1997 Metallurg Novokuznetsk – head coach
1999–2000 Neftyanik Almetievsk – head coach
2000–2002 Barys Astana – head coach
2002–2006 Kazakhstan National Hockey Team – head coach
2002–2005 Kazzinc-Torpedo – head coach
2005–2007 Barys Astana – head coach
2007–2008 Yuzhny Ural Orsk – head coach
2009–2010 Primorie Ussuriysk – head coach
2011–2012 Izhstal Izhevsk – head coach
2012–2013 HC Tambov – head coach
2014–2015 Kazzinc-Torpedo – head coach

References

External links
Nikolai Myshagin's coaching stats at Eliteprospects.com

1955 births
2020 deaths
Sportspeople from Oskemen
Soviet ice hockey players
Kazakhstani ice hockey players
Barys Astana head coaches
Kazakhstani ice hockey coaches
Kazakhstan men's national ice hockey team coaches